De Wereld Draait Door (English: "The world keeps on turning") also known by the acronym DWDD was an early-evening talk show on Dutch television, broadcast every weekday at 7:00 p.m. on NPO 1. It is the Netherlands' longest-running, regularly scheduled TV entertainment show and is also the program with the second-highest viewing figures on Dutch television, beaten only by the main evening news at 8.00 p.m. The show, created by Dieuwke Wynia and produced by BNNVARA, was discontinued after the last episode on 27 March 2020.

Content

The chat, conducted at a large table, was hosted by Matthijs van Nieuwkerk and a rotating guest co-host. Guests were politicians, celebrities, artists, or simply people involved in projects or organizations that were topics of interest. The show contained a mixture of news, information, television bloopers and general entertainment. Frequent guests and panelists included Jan Mulder, Yvon Jaspers, Halina Reijn, Giel Beelen, Mathijs Bouman, Sylvana Simons, Marc-Marie Huijbregts and André van Duin. House poet Nico Dijkshoorn had a weekly column in the show, usually on Wednesday.
Each show had a live performance of a band in the studio. The show's closing sequence was Lucky TV, a small movie clip that featured a parody of news with changed voice-over text added to the video. One of those ending clips, where Hillary Clinton and Donald Trump were singing a duet during a presidential debate, became a viral phenomenon.  From 2014, Dutch Eurovision Song Contest entries were premiered on the show.

DWDD University

DWDD University was a series of special episodes, in which a professional expert in a certain area held a one-and-a-half hour long lecture to a general audience. It commenced in 2012 with a lecture by then IAS director Robbert Dijkgraaf about the Big Bang.

The following speakers have contributed to DWDD university:

References

External links

 
 Website Lucky TV

Dutch television news shows
Dutch television talk shows
2005 Dutch television series debuts
2000s Dutch television series
2010s Dutch television series
Dutch comedy television series
Dutch television sketch shows
Dutch satirical television shows
Self-reflexive television
NPO 3 original programming